Childress (established 1887; incorporated 1890) is a city in Childress County, Texas, United States. The population was 6,905 at the 2010 census. It is the county seat of Childress County.

The city and county were named in honor of George Campbell Childress, a native of Nashville, Tennessee, who was the principal author of the Texas Declaration of Independence. The county and city were incorporated more than four decades after Childress's death.

In December 2015, the Seattle Post-Intelligencer voted Childress ninth among the ten "most conservative" cities in the United States in regard to political contributions. Other West Texas communities in the most conservative lineup are Hereford (No. 1), Monahans (No. 5), and  Dalhart in Dallam County in the far northwestern Texas Panhandle (No. 8). Princeton in Collin County north of Dallas ranked No. 2. In contrast, Vashon Island, Washington was named the "most liberal" city in the nation in terms of political donations.

History

Geography

Childress is bordered on the west by Hall County, on the southeast by Hardeman County, on the northeast by Harmon County, Oklahoma, on the north by Collingsworth County, and on the south by Cottle County.

Climate

Demographics

2020 census

As of the 2020 United States census, there were 5,737 people, 1,936 households, and 1,316 families residing in the city.

2000 census
As of the census of 2000, there were 6,778 people, 2,116 households, and 1,369 families residing in the city. The population density was 821.8 people per square mile (317.2/km). There were 2,554 housing units at an average density of 309.7 per square mile (119.5/km). The racial makeup of the city was 64.52% White, 15.65% African American, 0.34% Native American, 0.34% Asian, 0.06% Pacific Islander, 17.13% from other races, and 1.96% from two or more races. Hispanic or Latino of any race were 22.37% of the population.

There were 2,116 households, out of which 31.3% had children under the age of 18 living with them, 48.9% were married couples living together, 12.6% had a female householder with no husband present, and 35.3% were non-families. 32.8% of all households were made up of individuals, and 18.0% had someone living alone who was 65 years of age or older. The average household size was 2.37 and the average family size was 3.01.

In the city, the population was spread out, with 21.7% under the age of 18, 13.1% from 18 to 24, 31.3% from 25 to 44, 18.3% from 45 to 64, and 15.6% who were 65 years of age or older. The median age was 36 years. For every 100 females, there were 147.7 males. For every 100 females age 18 and over, there were 157.6 males.

The median income for a household in the city was $26,536, and the median income for a family was $33,323. Males had a median income of $25,365 versus $19,442 for females. The per capita income for the city was $11,708. About 14.6% of families and 18.6% of the population were below the poverty line, including 29.5% of those under age 18 and 10.2% of those age 65 or over.

Government
Republican Drew Springer, Jr., a businessman from Muenster in Cooke County, has since January 2013 represented Childress in the Texas House of Representatives.

The Texas Department of Criminal Justice (TDCJ) operates the Childress Distribution Center and the Roach Unit in two locations in Childress.

The United States Postal Service operates the Childress Post Office.

Culture and recreation
Fair Park Auditorium is located at the entrance to the city park. Nearby is the stadium for the Childress High School football team.

Education
Childress is served by the Childress Independent School District which operates an elementary school (grades PreK to 5), Childress Elementary School, middle school (grades 6 to 8), Childress Junior High School, and a high school (grades 9 to 12), Childress High School. The high school athletic teams are known as the Bobcats. The primary school color is blue, with secondary colors of white and red. The football team plays in a stadium in Fair Park. Basketball teams play in a gym on high school campus and the baseball team plays on their field located between the campus and Fair Park.

Clarendon College, a two-year community college, maintains a campus in Childress.

In popular media

Texas Chainsaw Massacre film – Childress is mentioned in the movie as the location with the nearest pay phone.

Brokeback Mountain book and movie – In both the movie and the book, Childress serves as the location from which Jack Twist's wife, Lureen, hails.

American Pickers television show – In the episode Law & Hoarder, the show visits a local attorney and picks through his warehouse of memorabilia.

Hell or High Water film – Although the movie was not filmed in Childress, much of the action surrounding the story and characters takes place in Childress.

Media

Radio
 K221FL
 K237EE
 KCTX-AM
 KCTX-FM

Newspaper
 The Red River Sun, formerly The Childress Index

Notable people

 Hardy Brown, NFL Linebacker
 Walter Chrysler, founder of Chrysler Motor Corporation, lived in Childress from 1905 to 1906
 Lou Dobbs, radio host and former anchor and managing editor for CNN's Lou Dobbs Tonight and now a FOX News Anchor
 Margaret A. Edwards, educator and librarian
 Roy Furr, founder of Furr's grocery store and cafeterias chain, lived in Childress County as a youth and worked with his father in Kirkland
 Ruby Gilbert, Kansas state representative
 James "T" Jones, Texas quarterback and Texas Tech Athletic director
 Bubba McDaniel, mixed martial artist fighting for the UFC

Gallery

References

External links
 City of Childress
 Childress, Texas in The Handbook of Texas Online
 Childress Independent School District
 Childress Regional Medical Center

Cities in Childress County, Texas
Cities in Texas
County seats in Texas
Populated places established in 1887